James Clarke (born 1972) is an author of books about cinema as well as a film and video producer.

He was a BAFTA shortlist producer for the short film drama Space Dance in January 2002.

He lives in Hereford, England.

Books 
War Films (Virgin Film) 1 August 2006
George Lucas (Pocket Essential series) 1 June 2002
Ridley Scott (Virgin Film) 1 March 2003
Movie Movements (Kamera Books) 1 March 2011
Animated Films (Virgin Film) 1 September 2007
Steven Spielberg (Pocket Essential series) 1 June 2004
Coppola (Virgin Film) 1 January 2004

References 

Amazon.com Books By James Clarke

British writers
Living people
1972 births